Martin Wells Knapp (1853–1901) was an American Methodist minister who founded several institutions including the magazine "God’s Revivalist" in 1888, the International Holiness Union and Prayer League (which became  the Pilgrim Holiness Church) in 1897, and God's Bible School, later known as God's Bible School and College. He was a central figure of the more radical wing of the Holiness movement.

Biography

Younger years
Martin Wells Knapp was born March 27, 1853, in Albion, Michigan, to very poor parents who lived in a log cabin. His father, Jared Knapp was a Methodist class-leader who had come from New-York to Michigan in 1836. Jared Knapp was the son of Samuel and Abigail Knapp, of Parma, Monroe County, New York. Martin's mother, Octavia, also a committed Christian, was the daughter of Melzar and Eunice Wells, of Sullivan, Madison County, New York. Martin had two half-sisters, Mrs Letta J. Conner who died in 1866 and Mrs R. V. Buck, wife of Amos Buck, of Stevensville, Montana. Martin also had a brother, L.J. Knapp who became a lawyer in Missoula, Montana. As his father's health was fragile, young Knapp had to help a lot on the farm.

Studies
Although Knapp was an extremely shy young man, at age 17, he began studies at a Methodist college in Albion, Michigan, on the 50 dollars his parents could give him after selling a calf. He continued to work on the family farm in the summer, never stopping his studies which he carried on during the night. 

Although he was always a religious boy he had a defining experience of conversion at age 19, through the fiancée he was corresponding with, Lucy J. Glenn. Martin was converted at 19 through Lucy's prayers and his mother's example. Soon he received his call to preach. When he was 23, he and Lucy were married.

Ministry
Right after his marriage, in 1877, he went on to a career in ministry, when the Methodist Michigan Conference assigned him a circuit. 
He was not as loud a preacher as his father had been. He was in fact very shy and unimpressive being only 5’4’’ and 120 pounds and his first impression upon strangers was almost always unfavorable. But on that first pastorate, Knapp demonstrated enough qualities to be allowed to stay on board.

A turning point in Knapp’s life came on his second pastorate in November 1882. He had long been wrestling with the inner bent to sinning. Under the ministry of William Taylor, who would become later the great missionary bishop of the Methodist Church, he claimed the blessing "now" in a revival at one of his own churches, entering thereby straight into the holiness movement.
In 1886, Knapp published his first book, "Christ Crowned Within", apparently selling off some of his own furniture to finance this publication. In 1887 the Michigan Conference permitted him to step out of the pastorate so he could follow the calling of an evangelist. The following year, in his mother's kitchen, he started "God’s Revivalist", a periodical devoted to the promotion of holiness.

During 1889–90, Martin W. Knapp went through a two-year period of adversity when he and his family were hit hard by disease and financial crises. The worst blow of all came on September 5, 1890, when his wife Lucy died after a long illness, leaving him with two small children.

In 1892, Knapp remarried with Minnie C. Ferle and moved to Cincinnati. During the ensuing period he impressed his biographer A. M. Hills as being "a little bundle of nerves and brain and heart, all alive and on fire for God and holiness." Judging after the results of the following years, it seems he was indeed never stopping to rest:
He set up a publishing house for holiness literature in the YMCA building. 
He established the Salvation Park Camp Meeting.
He called for and initiated holiness missionary work, enlisting missionaries and through his paper and camp meeting and raising funds for them. After visiting his school Charles and Lettie Cowman changed their missionary plans from school teaching to evangelism, and went to Japan to establish the Oriental Missionary Society, now the One Mission Society.
In September 1897, the International Holiness Union and Prayer League was organized in Knapp's home. Seth C. Rees was elected president and Martin W. Knapp vice-president. The dozen of people assembled there was intent on forming an inter-denominational society promoting holiness revivals and missions. But it later turned  into the Pilgrim Holiness Church, which would eventually help form The Wesleyan Church.
In 1900 he purchased a two-acre tract of land containing two large buildings, and founded God's Bible School there. The following year he built a new tabernacle on the campus for his camp meeting. God's Bible School later became known as God's Bible School and College.

End of life
By early 1901 the physically overextended Knapp caught a typhoid fever. His ministry continued even on his sickbed as he inquired of the nurses if they were on their way to heaven. He died in Cincinnati on December 7, 1901, at the age of 48, leaving behind him various thriving institutions, each in its own way perpetuating his influence and his message. He was buried in Spring Grove Cemetery, Cincinnati, Ohio.

Works
Knapp was a prolific author of books, pamphlets and hymns; his works include:
Christ Crowned Within, 1886
The Double Cure
Out of Egypt into Canaan, or Lessons in Spiritual Geography
Diary Letters; A Missionary Trip Through the West Indies and to South America
The River of Death and Its Branches
Pentecostal Preachers
Revival Kindlings, 1890
Revival Tornadoes; or, Life and Labors of Rev. Joseph H. Weber (McDonald, Gill & Company, 1890)
Impressions—How to Tell Whether They Are from Above or Below (Revivalist Publishing House; sixth edition, 1892)
Tears and Triumphs, with Leander L. Pickett & John R. Bryant (Columbia, South Carolina: L. L. Pickett, 1894)
Lightning Bolts from Pentecostal Skies; or, Devices of the Devil Unmasked, 1898
Holiness Triumphant, or, Pearls from Patmos, 1900
Bible Songs of Salvation and Victory, with R. E. McNeill (Cincinnati, Ohio: M. W. Knapp, circa 1902)

Legacy
Martin W. Knapp's legacy is impressive in all accounts as his message lived on and was passed on by the institutions he had founded. 
His flurry of activism is best explained by the division which appeared in the late 19th century within the holiness movement, "between traditionalist moderates who remained loyal to the old denominations and radicals who wanted to form new bodies committed to innovative theological currents such as the eminent physical return of Jesus and divine healing. Martin Wells Knapp was the central figure in the radical coalition. While holiness moderates in the National Holiness Association (NHA) attempt a two front war against foes that they believe where either dangerous liberals or rank fanatics, Knapp focused his attention on the moderates who he believed were hopelessly tied to such passing human documents as the Apostles Creed. Early radical centers were God’s Bible School in Cincinnati and the Chicago based ministries of E. L. Harvey and Duke Farson."

Notes

References
A Hero of Faith And Prayer: Life Of Rev. M. W. Knapp, by Aaron Merritt Hills .
 Lee Haines, Martin W. Knapp& Seth C. Rees, Two Pilgrims’ Progress, historical note

1853 births
1901 deaths
19th-century American male writers
19th-century American theologians
19th-century Methodist ministers
American evangelicals
Burials at Spring Grove Cemetery
Christian revivals
History of Methodism in the United States
Holiness movement
Methodists from Michigan
Methodist theologians
Methodist writers
People from Albion, Michigan